Martynas Mažeika (born 29 January 1985) is a Lithuanian professional basketball player for Neptūnas Klaipėda of the Lithuanian Basketball League. He is 1.92 m (6 ft 4 in) tall. He can play point guard or shooting guard, preferring the latter position.

Professional career
Mažeika began his professional career in 2000, aged 15, with the Lithuanian club Neptūnas where he stayed until 2004. He then moved to Alba Berlin for three years, the last one on loan to Telekom Baskets Bonn. Then he played at Capo d'Orlando and Khimik. During the 2008–09 season he returned to Neptūnas and started the 2009–10 season with VEF Rīga. On January 15, 2010 he joined the Greek League club A.E.K. Athens. In October 2010 he returned to Neptūnas again. In 2017 he signed with Estonian champions Kalev/Cramo.

Lithuania national team
He was a member of the 2001 Lithuanian National Cadet team, the 2002 Lithuanian Junior Team and the 2004 Under 20 Team.

Euroleague career statistics

|-
| style="text-align:left;"| 2014–15
| style="text-align:left;"| Neptūnas
| 9 || 8 || 23.0 || .294 || .208 || .714 || 1.8 || 1.9 || .7 || .1 || 6.1 || 4.2
|- class="sortbottom"
| style="text-align:left;"| Career
| style="text-align:left;"|
| 9 || 8 || 23.0 || .294 || .208 || .714 || 1.8 || 1.9 || .7 || .1 || 6.1 || 4.2

References

External links
 Eurocup Profile
 FIBA Europe profile
 Lithuanian League Profile
 Baltic League Profile
 Latvia League Profile

1985 births
Living people
AEK B.C. players
Alba Berlin players
BC Kalev/Cramo players
BC Khimik players
BC Neptūnas players
BK VEF Rīga players
Lithuanian men's basketball players
Orlandina Basket players
Point guards
Science City Jena players
Shooting guards
Telekom Baskets Bonn players
Tartu Ülikool/Rock players
Lithuanian expatriate basketball people in Estonia